The 1960–61 Saint Joseph's Hawks men's basketball team represented Saint Joseph's University as a member of the Middle Atlantic Conferences during the 1960–61 NCAA University Division men's basketball season. Led by 6th year head coach Jack Ramsay, the Hawks finished with an overall record of 25–5 (8–0 in Mid-Atlantic play). Saint Joseph's won the conference title, and received a bid to the NCAA tournament. The team defeated Princeton and Wake Forest to advance to the school's only Final Four to date before losing to No. 1 Ohio State in the National semifinals.

Roster

Schedule and results

|-
!colspan=9 style=| Regular season

|-
!colspan=9 style=| NCAA Tournament

Rankings

Awards and honors
Jack Egan – AP Honorable Mention All-American

References

Saint Joseph's Hawks men's basketball seasons
Saint Joseph's
Saint Joseph's
NCAA Division I men's basketball tournament Final Four seasons